"Freedom" is a song by Australian rock-pop band Noiseworks. It was released in May 1990 as the first single from their third studio album Love Versus Money (1991) and peaked at number 30 on the ARIA singles chart in June 1990.

Track listing
CD single (655832 7)

Charts

External links
 https://www.discogs.com/Noiseworks-Freedom/master/410214

References

Noiseworks songs
1990 songs
1990 singles
Columbia Records singles
Songs written by Justin Stanley
Songs written by Steve Balbi
Songs written by Jon Stevens